Van Gogh's Chair is a painting created in 1888 by Dutch artist Vincent van Gogh. It is currently held by the National Gallery, London.

The painting shows a rustic wooden chair, with a simple woven straw seat, on a tiled floor. On the chair seat is a decorated pipe and a pouch of pipe tobacco. In the background is an onion box with Van Gogh's name on it. It has become one of Van Gogh's most iconic images, to the extent that Van Gogh's cataloger Jan Hulsker noted that "there are few pictures of Vincent's about which so much was written in later years."

Background
On 7 May 1888 Van Gogh moved from the Hôtel Carrel to the Café de la Gare,  at Arles, in the south of France. He had befriended the proprietors, Joseph and Marie Ginoux. The Yellow House, at 2 place Lamartine, had to be furnished before he could fully move in, but he was able to use it as a studio. He wanted a gallery to display his work, and started a series of paintings that eventually included Van Gogh's Chair (1888), Bedroom in Arles (1888), The Night Café (1888), Cafe Terrace at Night (September 1888), Starry Night Over the Rhone (1888), and Still Life: Vase with Twelve Sunflowers (1888), all intended for the decoration for the Yellow House.

Description

Van Gogh's Chair is a product of the artist's tumultuous time spent with fellow painter Paul Gauguin. Both this work and its pendant piece Paul Gauguin's Armchair are painted in complementary colours, blue and orange for van Gogh, red and green for Gauguin. The two paintings were painted before Van Gogh cut off his ear, but continued to be refined after he was hospitalised. Van Gogh set out to "in these two studies, as in others, I myself sought an effect of light with bright colour"

Analysis
The contrasts between Van Gogh's Chair and Paul Gauguin's Armchair have led to much analysis of the symbolism of these two paintings. While Van Gogh's chair is simple and unpretentious, Gauguin's is far more lavish and ornate. This has been interpreted in light of Van Gogh and Gauguin's tempestuous relationship.

See also
 Décoration for the Yellow House

References

Sources
 
 
 
 
 

Paintings by Vincent van Gogh
1888 paintings